Robert Hampson (born 1965) is an English musician and composer

Robert Hampson may also refer to:

Robert Gavin Hampson (born 1948), British poet and academic
Robert Hampson (1537–1607), Sheriff of the City of London

See also 
Robert Sampson (disambiguation)